Polly Maberly (born 1976) is an English actress, known for portraying the role of Kitty Bennet in the BBC's 1995 adaptation of Pride and Prejudice. She is the older sister of actress Kate Maberly.

Television
 The Children of Green Knowe (Linnet Oldknow, 1986)
 2point4 Children (TV series) (Jackie in "I'm Going Slightly Mad", 1992)
 Pride and Prejudice (miniseries) (Kitty Bennet, 1995)
 Midsomer Murders (TV series) (Julie Stockard in "Who Killed Cock Robin", 2001)
 The Bill (TV series) (Carol Lewis in 045, 2002)
 The Royal (Dr. Lucy Klein in Series 2 & 3, 2003)
 Harley Street (Kate Fielding, 2008)
 Doctors (Carol Bettany in "Eat for Two", 2008)
 Holby City (Molly Guillory in "Tough Love", 2009)
 Foyles War (Edith Milner Series 6 & 7, 2008 & 2010)
 Holby City (Georgia Staniford in 'Going, Going...', 2014)
 EastEnders (DI Ellie Kent, 2017–2018)
 Doctors (Charlotte Simms, 2022)

Stage
 The 39 Steps (Pamela Arbroath) - Greece
 The Honest Whore (Belafront, leading lady)
 Cece, L'Uomo dal Fiore in Bocca (The Man With The Flower In His Mouth), "I'm Dreaming Or Am I?" (Nada, leading lady) a triple bill of plays by Luigi Pirandello - New End Theatre, London.  1999
 The Browning Version (play) (Mrs Gilbert) - Theatre Royal Bath.  2000
 The Tempest (Miranda) - Summer Shakespeare Festivities, Prague Castle/Spilberk Castle, Brno. 2000
 Under the Doctor (written by Peter Tilbury) - Churchill Theatre, Bromley/ Comedy Theatre, London.  2001
 When Harry Met Sally... (Helen).  2005
 Hedda Gabler (Thea Elvsted) - West Yorkshire Playhouse, Liverpool Playhouse.  2006
 Drowning on Dry Land (play) (Linzi Ellison, leading lady) Salisbury Playhouse.  2008

References

External links
 

20th-century English actresses
21st-century English actresses
English soap opera actresses
English television actresses
Living people
Alumni of RADA
English child actresses
English stage actresses
Place of birth missing (living people)
Year of birth missing (living people)